Dozdak is a village in Baladeh Kojur Rural District, in the Central District of Nowshahr County, Mazandaran Province, Iran. At the 2006 census, its population was 765, in 195 families.

References 

Populated places in Nowshahr County